This is a detailed list of human spaceflights from 1971 to 1980, including the later Apollo Moon landings, the US Skylab missions, and the start of the Soviet Union's Salyut series of space stations.

Red indicates fatalities.
Green indicates suborbital flights (including flights that failed to attain intended orbit).
Grey indicates flights to the Moon.

See also

List of human spaceflight programs
List of human spaceflights
List of human spaceflights, 1961–1970
List of human spaceflights, 1981–1990
List of human spaceflights, 1991–2000
List of human spaceflights, 2001–2010
List of human spaceflights, 2011–2020
List of human spaceflights, 2021–present

References
Vostok and Voskhod flight history
Mercury flight history
X-15 flight history (altitudes given in feet)
Gemini flight history
Apollo flight history (student resource)
Skylab flight history
Apollo–Soyuz flight history
Space Shuttle flight history infographic
Shenzhou flight history timeline
SpaceShipOne flight history

 1971
1971
Spaceflight timelines
1970s-related lists

cs:Seznam pilotovaných vesmírných letů 1961-1986
pl:Loty kosmiczne 1961-1965